Chen Wenbin may refer to:

Akira Chen (born 1969), Taiwanese actor and politician
Chen Wen-bin (born 1973), Taiwanese baseball player